Mrs. Grass is a food brand used on instant soups, and noodle soups, currently commercialised through the Wyler's brand, from the Kraft Heinz brand portfolio. The former Mrs. Grass company had been born as a familiar business in Chicago in 1915, operating independently until 1986.

History 
Founder "Mrs. Grass" was born Sophie Dreifuss, in Baden, Germany. She married I.J. (Isaac Jerome) Grass and lived in Chicago, Illinois, on the city's south side. She and her husband opened a delicatessen in 1901 and lived above the store. Her noodle soup sold so well from the delicatessen that they opened their own noodle factory, the "I.J. Grass Noodle Company" at 6027 Wentworth Ave, in 1915. In 1939, developments in food dehydration allowed the company to create a dried noodle soup mix. Between 1917 and 1925 they expanded to three locations, and by the 1960s, I.J. Grass Noodle Company was a multi-million dollar company.

Sophie and Isaac had two sons, A. Irving Grass and Sidney Grass. Irving became president of the company, and  Sidney became vice president and secretary.

During the 1950s, Mrs. Grass sponsored a Saturday morning children's radio program, featuring the space travel adventures of the hero "Super Noodle". Mrs. Grass was acquired by Borden in 1986. When Borden sold its food division in 2001, the soup was acquired by Heinz and noodles was acquired by American Italian Pasta Company.

Isaac Jerome Grass died in October 1925. Sophie Grass died in 1953 at the age of 74.

The magic egg (egg nugget)
Mrs. Grass soup was unique with its inclusion of a self-contained 'magic egg', which Wyler's calls the Golden Flavor Nugget. The Golden Flavor Nugget dissolved as it boiled, releasing oils and chicken bouillon into the water.

To the dismay of many Mrs. Grass soup eaters, the "magic egg" was discontinued sometime around February 2016.

Novelty song musician The great Luke Ski has written and recorded a beat poetry-style song, "Ode To Mrs. Grass' Chicken Noodle Soup".

References

External links
 

Borden (company)
Brand name soups
Heinz brands